Bubacarr Marong (born 10 January 2000) is a Gambian professional footballer who plays as a centre-back for Italian  club Gelbison, on loan from Palermo.

Club career 
Marong reached Italy in 2017 as a refugee from his native Gambia, reaching the Sicilian coast of Trapani after having spent months in Libya to save enough money to pay for the sailing trip. He was then relocated to Palermo, where he was noticed by Salvatore Tedesco, a former footballer and brother of Giacomo and Giovanni Tedesco, as well as Paolo Calafiore, head coach of Eccellenza amateurs Parmonval, based in the Palermo neighborhood of Mondello, who eventually signed him, and with whom he played 30 games.

In 2019, following Palermo's exclusion from professional football and the club being readmitted to Serie D under a new property, he was signed by the Rosanero for the 2019–20 season, during which he however failed in making his debut; despite that, he was confirmed by Palermo for the club's upcoming Serie C season.

On 11 April 2021, Marong finally made his debut on a Rosanero shirt under head coach Giacomo Filippi, playing the full 90 minutes in a 2020–21 Serie C league game against Vibonese. He was subsequently featured on a consistent basis for the ending part of the season, including all of the four promotion playoff games; his performances won him a new four-year professional contract, which he signed in August 2021.

On 29 July 2022, he was loaned out to newly-promoted Serie C club Gelbison.

Career statistics

Club

References

2000 births
Living people
Gambian footballers
Association football central defenders
Palermo F.C. players
Serie C players
Gambian expatriate footballers
Expatriate footballers in Italy
Gambian expatriate sportspeople in Italy